Clionella costata is a species of sea snail, a marine gastropod mollusk in the family Clavatulidae.

Description
(Original description) The shell has a fusiform shape and is longitudinally ribbed. There is a deep sinus at the top of the outer lip. The base is contracted. The siphonal canal is wide.

The figure of the type, produced by Swainson, shows a shell with a tapering base, unlike any other species of Clionella.

Distribution

References

External links

costata
Gastropods described in 1840